Of the 102 counties in the state of Illinois, 17 are divided into minor civil divisions known as precincts.  The 261 such precincts in Illinois are listed below. The remaining 85 counties are divided into 1,433 townships. Despite this distinction, precincts are also sometimes referred to as "civil townships".

Unlike electoral precincts, these precincts are not necessarily restricted to a single electoral district. Instead, they serve as administrative divisions of county government.

Illinois precincts by name

A
 Adkins Precinct, Massac County
 Albion No. 1 Precinct, Edwards County
 Albion No. 2 Precinct, Edwards County
 Albion No. 3 Precinct, Edwards County
 Alexander Precinct, Morgan County
 Alsey Precinct, Scott County
 Alto Pass Precinct, Union County
 America Precinct, Pulaski County
 Anna District 1 Precinct, Union County
 Anna District 2 Precinct, Union County
 Anna District 3 Precinct, Union County
 Anna District 4 Precinct, Union County
 Anna District 5 Precinct, Union County
 Anna District 6 Precinct, Union County
 Anna District 7 Precinct, Union County
 Arcadia Precinct, Morgan County
 Athens North No. 2 Precinct, Menard County
 Athens South No. 1 Precinct, Menard County
 Atterberry No. 10 Precinct, Menard County

B
 Balcom Precinct, Union County
 Baldwin Precinct, Randolph County
 Beaucoup Precinct, Perry County
 Belknap Precinct, Johnson County
 Belleview Precinct, Calhoun County
 Bellmont Precinct, Wabash County
 Benton Precinct, Massac County
 Blair Precinct, Randolph County
 Blairsville Precinct, Williamson County
 Bloomfield Precinct, Johnson County
 Bloomfield Precinct, Scott County
 Bone Gap Precinct, Edwards County
 Bremen Precinct, Randolph County
 Brewerville Precinct, Randolph County
 Browns Precinct, Edwards County
 Burnside Precinct, Johnson County

C
 Cache Precinct, Alexander County
 Cache Precinct, Johnson County
 Cairo Precinct, Alexander County
 Carlin Precinct, Calhoun County
 Carterville Precinct, Williamson County
 Cave-In-Rock Precinct, Hardin County
 Central Precinct, Randolph County
 Chapin Precinct, Morgan County
 Chester Precinct, Randolph County
 Cobden District 1 Precinct, Union County
 Cobden District 2 Precinct, Union County
 Coffee Precinct, Wabash County
 Compton Precinct, Wabash County
 Concord Precinct, Morgan County
 Corinth Precinct, Williamson County
 Coulterville Precinct, Randolph County
 Crab Orchard Precinct, Williamson County
 Crater Precinct, Calhoun County
 Creal Springs Precinct, Williamson County
 Cutler Precinct, Perry County

D
 Dixon Precinct, Edwards County
 Dongola District 1 Precinct, Union County
 Dongola District 2 Precinct, Union County
 Du Quoin No. 1 Precinct, Perry County
 Du Quoin No. 2 Precinct, Perry County
 Du Quoin No. 3 Precinct, Perry County
 Du Quoin No. 4 Precinct, Perry County
 Du Quoin No. 5 Precinct, Perry County
 Du Quoin No. 6 Precinct, Perry County
 Du Quoin No. 7 Precinct, Perry County
 Du Quoin No. 8 Precinct, Perry County
 Du Quoin No. 9 Precinct, Perry County
 Du Quoin No. 10 Precinct, Perry County
 Du Quoin No. 11 Precinct, Perry County
 Du Quoin No. 12 Precinct, Perry County

E
 East Brooklyn Precinct, Massac County
 East Marion Precinct, Williamson County
 East Rosiclare Precinct, Hardin County
 Eddyville No. 6 Precinct, Pope County
 Ellery Precinct, Edwards County
 Ellis Grove Precinct, Randolph County
 Elvira Precinct, Johnson County
 Evansville Precinct, Randolph County
 Exeter-Bluffs Precinct, Scott County

F
 Fancy Prairie No. 3 Precinct, Menard County
 Franklin Precinct, Massac County
 Franklin Precinct, Morgan County
 French Creek Precinct, Edwards County
 Friendsville Precinct, Wabash County

G
 Georges Creek Precinct, Massac County
 Gilead Precinct, Calhoun County
 Glasgow Precinct, Scott County
 Golconda No. 1 Precinct, Pope County
 Golconda No. 2 Precinct, Pope County
 Golconda No. 3 Precinct, Pope County
 Goreville No. 1 Precinct, Johnson County
 Goreville No. 2 Precinct, Johnson County
 Grand Chain Precinct, Pulaski County
 Grant Precinct, Massac County
 Grantsburg No. 1 Precinct, Johnson County
 Grantsburg No. 2 Precinct, Johnson County
 Grassy Precinct, Williamson County
 Greenview No. 6 Precinct, Menard County

H
 Hamburg Precinct, Calhoun County
 Hardin Precinct, Calhoun County
 Herrin Precinct, Williamson County
 Hillerman Precinct, Massac County

I
 Indian Creek No. 7 Precinct, Menard County
 Irish Grove No. 4 Precinct, Menard County

J
 Jackson Precinct, Massac County
 Jacksonville No. 1 Precinct, Morgan County
 Jacksonville No. 2 Precinct, Morgan County
 Jacksonville No. 3 Precinct, Morgan County
 Jacksonville No. 4 Precinct, Morgan County
 Jacksonville No. 5 Precinct, Morgan County
 Jacksonville No. 6 Precinct, Morgan County
 Jacksonville No. 7 Precinct, Morgan County
 Jacksonville No. 8 Precinct, Morgan County
 Jacksonville No. 9 Precinct, Morgan County
 Jacksonville No. 10 Precinct, Morgan County
 Jacksonville No. 11 Precinct, Morgan County
 Jacksonville No. 12 Precinct, Morgan County
 Jacksonville No. 13 Precinct, Morgan County
 Jacksonville No. 14 Precinct, Morgan County
 Jacksonville No. 15 Precinct, Morgan County
 Jacksonville No. 16 Precinct, Morgan County
 Jacksonville No. 17 Precinct, Morgan County
 Jacksonville No. 18 Precinct, Morgan County
 Jefferson No. 4 Precinct, Pope County
 Jefferson Precinct, Massac County
 Jonesboro District 1 Precinct, Union County
 Jonesboro District 2 Precinct, Union County
 Jonesboro District 3 Precinct, Union County

K
 Karnak Precinct, Pulaski County
 Kaskaskia Precinct, Randolph County

L
 Lake Creek Precinct, Williamson County
 Lake No. 1 Precinct, Johnson County
 Lake No. 2 Precinct, Johnson County
 Lancaster Precinct, Wabash County
 Lick Creek Precinct, Union County
 Lick Prairie Precinct, Wabash County
 Lincoln Precinct, Massac County
 Literberry Precinct, Morgan County
 Logan Precinct, Massac County
 Lynnville Precinct, Morgan County

M
 Manchester Precinct, Scott County
 Markham Precinct, Morgan County
 McClure Precinct, Alexander County
 McFarlan Precinct, Hardin County
 Meredosia No. 1 Precinct, Morgan County
 Meredosia No. 2 Precinct, Morgan County
 Merritt Precinct, Scott County
 Metropolis No. 1 Precinct, Massac County
 Metropolis No. 2 Precinct, Massac County
 Metropolis No. 3 Precinct, Massac County
 Metropolis No. 4 Precinct, Massac County
 Mill Creek Precinct, Union County
 Monroe Precinct, Hardin County
 Mound City Precinct, Pulaski County
 Mounds Precinct, Pulaski County
 Mount Carmel Precinct, Wabash County
 Murrayville Precinct, Morgan County

N
 Naples-Bluffs Precinct, Scott County
 Nortonville Precinct, Morgan County

O
 Oakford No. 9 Precinct, Menard County
 Olive Branch Precinct, Alexander County
 Olmsted Precinct, Pulaski County
 Ozark Precinct, Johnson County

P
 Palestine Precinct, Randolph County
 Percy Precinct, Randolph County
 Perks Precinct, Pulaski County
 Petersburg East No. 13 Precinct, Menard County
 Petersburg North No. 14 Precinct, Menard County
 Petersburg South No. 15 Precinct, Menard County
 Petersburg West No. 16 Precinct, Menard County
 Pinckneyville No. 1 Precinct, Perry County
 Pinckneyville No. 2 Precinct, Perry County
 Pinckneyville No. 3 Precinct, Perry County
 Pinckneyville No. 4 Precinct, Perry County
 Pinckneyville No. 5 Precinct, Perry County
 Pinckneyville No. 6 Precinct, Perry County
 Pinckneyville No. 7 Precinct, Perry County
 Pinckneyville No. 8 Precinct, Perry County
 Pisgah Precinct, Morgan County
 Point Precinct, Calhoun County
 Prairie du Rocher Precinct, Randolph County
 Precinct 1, Monroe County
 Precinct 2, Monroe County
 Precinct 3, Monroe County
 Precinct 4, Monroe County
 Precinct 5, Monroe County
 Precinct 6, Monroe County
 Precinct 7, Monroe County
 Precinct 8, Monroe County
 Precinct 9, Monroe County
 Precinct 10, Monroe County
 Precinct 11, Monroe County
 Precinct 12, Monroe County
 Precinct 13, Monroe County
 Precinct 15, Monroe County
 Precinct 16, Monroe County
 Precinct 17, Monroe County
 Precinct 18, Monroe County
 Precinct 19, Monroe County
 Precinct 20, Monroe County
 Precinct 21, Monroe County
 Precinct 22, Monroe County
 Precinct 23, Monroe County
 Precinct 24, Monroe County
 Precinct 25, Monroe County
 Precinct 26, Monroe County
 Precinct 27, Monroe County
 Precinct 28, Monroe County
 Precinct 29, Monroe County
 Precinct 30, Monroe County
 Precinct 31, Monroe County
 Precinct 32, Monroe County
 Precinct 33, Monroe County
 Precinct 34, Monroe County
 Precinct 35, Monroe County
 Precinct 36, Monroe County
 Precinct 37, Monroe County
 Prentice-Sinclair Precinct, Morgan County
 Pulaski Precinct, Pulaski County

R
 Red Bud Precinct, Randolph County
 Richwood Precinct, Calhoun County
 Rock Creek No. 12 Precinct, Menard County
 Rock Precinct, Hardin County
 Rockwood Precinct, Randolph County
 Ruma Precinct, Randolph County

S
 Salem No. 1 Precinct, Edwards County
 Salem No. 2 Precinct, Edwards County
 Sandridge No. 8 Precinct, Menard County
 Sandusky Precinct, Alexander County
 Saratoga Precinct, Union County
 Shelby No. 1 Precinct, Edwards County
 Shelby No. 2 Precinct, Edwards County
 Simpson Precinct, Johnson County
 South Jacksonville No. 1 Precinct, Morgan County
 South Jacksonville No. 2 Precinct, Morgan County
 South Jacksonville No. 3 Precinct, Morgan County
 South Jacksonville No. 4 Precinct, Morgan County
 Southern Precinct, Williamson County
 Sparta Precinct, Randolph County
 Steeleville Precinct, Randolph County
 Stokes Precinct, Union County
 Stone Church Precinct, Hardin County
 Stonefort Precinct, Williamson County
 Sugar Grove No. 5 Precinct, Menard County
 Sunfield Precinct, Perry County
 Swanwick Precinct, Perry County

T
 Tallula No. 11 Precinct, Menard County
 Tamaroa No. 1 Precinct, Perry County
 Tamaroa No. 2 Precinct, Perry County
 Tamms Precinct, Alexander County
 Thebes Precinct, Alexander County
 Tilden Precinct, Randolph County
 Tunnel Hill Precinct, Johnson County

U
 Ullin Precinct, Pulaski County
 Union Precinct, Union County

V
 Vienna No. 1 Precinct, Johnson County
 Vienna No. 2 Precinct, Johnson County
 Vienna No. 3 Precinct, Johnson County
 Villa Ridge Precinct, Pulaski County

W
 Wabash Precinct, Wabash County
 Walsh Precinct, Randolph County
 Washington Precinct, Massac County
 Waverly No. 1 Precinct, Morgan County
 Waverly No. 2 Precinct, Morgan County
 Waverly No. 3 Precinct, Morgan County
 Webster No. 5 Precinct, Pope County
 West Brooklyn Precinct, Massac County
 West Marion Precinct, Williamson County
 West Rosiclare Precinct, Hardin County
 Wetaug Precinct, Pulaski County
 Willisville Precinct, Perry County
 Winchester No. 1 Precinct, Scott County
 Winchester No. 2 Precinct, Scott County
 Winchester No. 3 Precinct, Scott County
 Wine Hill Precinct, Randolph County
 Woodson Precinct, Morgan County

Illinois precincts by county

Alexander County

 Cache Precinct
 Cairo Precinct
 McClure Precinct
 Olive Branch Precinct
 Sandusky Precinct
 Tamms Precinct
 Thebes Precinct

Calhoun County

 Belleview Precinct
 Carlin Precinct
 Crater Precinct
 Gilead Precinct
 Hamburg Precinct
 Hardin Precinct
 Point Precinct
 Richwood Precinct

Edwards County

 Albion No. 1 Precinct
 Albion No. 2 Precinct
 Albion No. 3 Precinct
 Bone Gap Precinct
 Browns Precinct
 Dixon Precinct
 Ellery Precinct
 French Creek Precinct
 Salem No. 1 Precinct
 Salem No. 2 Precinct
 Shelby No. 1 Precinct
 Shelby No. 2 Precinct

Hardin County

 Cave-In-Rock Precinct
 East Rosiclare Precinct
 McFarlan Precinct
 Monroe Precinct
 Rock Precinct
 Stone Church Precinct
 West Rosiclare Precinct

Johnson County

 Belknap Precinct
 Bloomfield Precinct
 Burnside Precinct
 Cache Precinct
 Elvira Precinct
 Goreville No. 1 Precinct
 Goreville No. 2 Precinct
 Grantsburg No. 1 Precinct
 Grantsburg No. 2 Precinct
 Lake No. 1 Precinct
 Lake No. 2 Precinct
 Ozark Precinct
 Simpson Precinct
 Tunnel Hill Precinct
 Vienna No. 1 Precinct
 Vienna No. 2 Precinct
 Vienna No. 3 Precinct

Massac County

 Adkins Precinct
 Benton Precinct
 East Brooklyn Precinct
 Franklin Precinct
 Georges Creek Precinct
 Grant Precinct
 Hillerman Precinct
 Jackson Precinct
 Jefferson Precinct
 Lincoln Precinct
 Logan Precinct
 Metropolis No. 1 Precinct
 Metropolis No. 2 Precinct
 Metropolis No. 3 Precinct
 Metropolis No. 4 Precinct
 Washington Precinct
 West Brooklyn Precinct

Menard County

 Athens North No. 2 Precinct
 Athens South No. 1 Precinct
 Atterberry No. 10 Precinct
 Fancy Prairie No. 3 Precinct
 Greenview No. 6 Precinct
 Indian Creek No. 7 Precinct
 Irish Grove No. 4 Precinct
 Oakford No. 9 Precinct
 Petersburg East No. 13 Precinct
 Petersburg North No. 14 Precinct
 Petersburg South No. 15 Precinct
 Petersburg West No. 16 Precinct
 Rock Creek No. 12 Precinct
 Sandridge No. 8 Precinct
 Sugar Grove No. 5 Precinct
 Tallula No. 11 Precinct

Monroe County

 Precinct 1
 Precinct 2
 Precinct 3
 Precinct 4
 Precinct 5
 Precinct 6
 Precinct 7
 Precinct 8
 Precinct 9
 Precinct 10
 Precinct 11
 Precinct 12
 Precinct 13
 Precinct 15
 Precinct 16
 Precinct 17
 Precinct 18
 Precinct 19
 Precinct 20
 Precinct 21
 Precinct 22
 Precinct 23
 Precinct 24
 Precinct 25
 Precinct 26
 Precinct 27
 Precinct 28
 Precinct 29
 Precinct 30
 Precinct 31
 Precinct 32
 Precinct 33
 Precinct 34
 Precinct 35
 Precinct 36
 Precinct 37

Morgan County

 Alexander Precinct
 Arcadia Precinct
 Chapin Precinct
 Concord Precinct
 Franklin Precinct
 Jacksonville No. 1 Precinct
 Jacksonville No. 2 Precinct
 Jacksonville No. 3 Precinct
 Jacksonville No. 4 Precinct
 Jacksonville No. 5 Precinct
 Jacksonville No. 6 Precinct
 Jacksonville No. 7 Precinct
 Jacksonville No. 8 Precinct
 Jacksonville No. 9 Precinct
 Jacksonville No. 10 Precinct
 Jacksonville No. 11 Precinct
 Jacksonville No. 12 Precinct
 Jacksonville No. 13 Precinct
 Jacksonville No. 14 Precinct
 Jacksonville No. 15 Precinct
 Jacksonville No. 16 Precinct
 Jacksonville No. 17 Precinct
 Jacksonville No. 18 Precinct
 Literberry Precinct
 Lynnville Precinct
 Markham Precinct
 Meredosia No. 1 Precinct
 Meredosia No. 2 Precinct
 Murrayville Precinct
 Nortonville Precinct
 Pisgah Precinct
 Prentice-Sinclair Precinct
 South Jacksonville No. 1 Precinct
 South Jacksonville No. 2 Precinct
 South Jacksonville No. 3 Precinct
 South Jacksonville No. 4 Precinct
 Waverly No. 1 Precinct
 Waverly No. 2 Precinct
 Waverly No. 3 Precinct
 Woodson Precinct

Perry County

 Beaucoup Precinct
 Cutler Precinct
 Du Quoin No. 1 Precinct
 Du Quoin No. 2 Precinct
 Du Quoin No. 3 Precinct
 Du Quoin No. 4 Precinct
 Du Quoin No. 5 Precinct
 Du Quoin No. 6 Precinct
 Du Quoin No. 7 Precinct
 Du Quoin No. 8 Precinct
 Du Quoin No. 9 Precinct
 Du Quoin No. 10 Precinct
 Du Quoin No. 11 Precinct
 Du Quoin No. 12 Precinct
 Pinckneyville No. 1 Precinct
 Pinckneyville No. 2 Precinct
 Pinckneyville No. 3 Precinct
 Pinckneyville No. 4 Precinct
 Pinckneyville No. 5 Precinct
 Pinckneyville No. 6 Precinct
 Pinckneyville No. 7 Precinct
 Pinckneyville No. 8 Precinct
 Sunfield Precinct
 Swanwick Precinct
 Tamaroa No. 1 Precinct
 Tamaroa No. 2 Precinct
 Willisville Precinct

Pope County

 Eddyville No. 6 Precinct
 Golconda No. 1 Precinct
 Golconda No. 2 Precinct
 Golconda No. 3 Precinct
 Jefferson No. 4 Precinct
 Webster No. 5 Precinct

Pulaski County

 America Precinct
 Grand Chain Precinct
 Karnak Precinct
 Mound City Precinct
 Mounds Precinct
 Olmsted Precinct
 Perks Precinct
 Pulaski Precinct
 Ullin Precinct
 Villa Ridge Precinct
 Wetaug Precinct

Randolph County

 Baldwin Precinct
 Blair Precinct
 Bremen Precinct
 Brewerville Precinct
 Central Precinct
 Chester Precinct
 Coulterville Precinct
 Ellis Grove Precinct
 Evansville Precinct
 Kaskaskia Precinct
 Palestine Precinct
 Percy Precinct
 Prairie du Rocher Precinct
 Red Bud Precinct
 Rockwood Precinct
 Ruma Precinct
 Sparta Precinct
 Steeleville Precinct
 Tilden Precinct
 Walsh Precinct
 Wine Hill Precinct

Scott County

 Alsey Precinct
 Bloomfield Precinct
 Exeter-Bluffs Precinct
 Glasgow Precinct
 Manchester Precinct
 Merritt Precinct
 Naples-Bluffs Precinct
 Winchester No. 1 Precinct
 Winchester No. 2 Precinct
 Winchester No. 3 Precinct

Union County

 Alto Pass Precinct
 Anna District 1 Precinct
 Anna District 2 Precinct
 Anna District 3 Precinct
 Anna District 4 Precinct
 Anna District 5 Precinct
 Anna District 6 Precinct
 Anna District 7 Precinct
 Balcom Precinct
 Cobden District 1 Precinct
 Cobden District 2 Precinct
 Dongola District 1 Precinct
 Dongola District 2 Precinct
 Jonesboro District 1 Precinct
 Jonesboro District 2 Precinct
 Jonesboro District 3 Precinct
 Lick Creek Precinct
 Mill Creek Precinct
 Saratoga Precinct
 Stokes Precinct
 Union Precinct

Wabash County

 Bellmont Precinct
 Coffee Precinct
 Compton Precinct
 Friendsville Precinct
 Lancaster Precinct
 Lick Prairie Precinct
 Mount Carmel Precinct
 Wabash Precinct

Williamson County

 Blairsville Precinct
 Carterville Precinct
 Corinth Precinct
 Crab Orchard Precinct
 Creal Springs Precinct
 East Marion Precinct
 Grassy Precinct
 Herrin Precinct
 Lake Creek Precinct
 Southern Precinct
 Stonefort Precinct
 West Marion Precinct

See also

 List of counties in Illinois
 List of townships in Illinois

References

 2010 Census Gazetteer
 National Association of Towns and Townships
 Township Officials of Illinois

Precincts in Illinois, List of
Local government in Illinois